Zjawiński (feminine: Zjawińska, plural: Zjawińscy) is a Polish-language surname. Notable people with the surname include:

 Dariusz Zjawiński (born 1986), Polish footballer
 Łukasz Zjawiński (born 2001), Polish footballer

See also
 
 

Polish-language surnames